Peter Joseph Lenné (the Younger) (29 September 1789 – 23 January 1866) was a Prussian gardener and landscape architect. As director general of the Royal Prussian palaces and parks in Potsdam and Berlin, his work shaped the development of 19th-century German garden design in the Neoclassical style. Laid out according to the principles of the English landscape garden, his parks are now World Heritage Sites.

Life and works
Lenné was born in Bonn, then part of the Electorate of Cologne, the son of the court and university gardener Peter Joseph Lenné the Elder (1756–1821), and his wife, Anna Catharina Potgieter (also Potgeter), daughter of the mayor of Rheinberg. The Lenné family descended from the Prince-Bishopric of Liège. Circa 1665, Peter Joseph's ancestor Augustin Le Neu had settled in Poppelsdorf near Bonn as court gardener of Archbishop-Elector Maximilian Henry of Bavaria.

Childhood and development
Having  obtained his Abitur degree, Peter Joseph Lenné decided to adopt the family tradition. He began his apprenticeship as a gardener in 1808 with his uncle, Josef Clemens Weyhe, court gardener at the electoral Augustusburg and Falkenlust Palaces, Brühl. At the instigation of his father, he also took university courses in botany.

From 1809 to 1812, his father paid for Lenné's many study trips to France, Switzerland, and Southern Germany. In 1811, he completed a long internship in Paris with Gabriel Thouin, who was then one of the most famous garden architects in Europe. This made him a master landscaper. On another of these trips, Lenné made the acquaintance of the creator of the English Garden in Munich, the landscape gardener Friedrich Ludwig von Sckell, who would have a lasting influence on Lenné's work.

Assistant gardener 

In 1812, Lenné followed his father to Koblenz, where he had been named Director of the Gardens by the Prefect Jules Doazan. Later in that year, Lenné became active at Schloss Schönbrunn, where he would remain until 1814. He then returned to Koblenz, where he was given private garden commissions until 1815. Extensions to the city's fortifications gave him an opportunity to propose a plan for its beautification by the addition of gardens; however, this was not carried out because of lack of funds. In 1816, he returned to Potsdam at the suggestion of Prussian forestry official Georg Ludwig Hartig and General Graf von Hacke. There he received the position of Assistant Gardener to the Court Garden Director at Sanssouci.

While still working as an assistant gardener, in spring 1816 Lenné received a commission from the Prussian Chancellor Karl August von Hardenberg to renovate the grounds around his country house at Klein-Glienicke. This work on Glienicke Palace, which would later become Prince Carl of Prussia's residence, laid the groundwork for Lenné's designs for the surrounding area of Potsdam, which he wanted to turn into a Gesamtkunstwerk. The upgrades of the Glienicke grounds were followed - in close cooperation with the architects Karl Friedrich Schinkel, Ludwig Persius, and Ferdinand von Arnim - by those of others such as the Böttcherberg and facing it Babelsberg Park, which was completed by Prince Hermann von Pückler-Muskau. Characteristic of Lenné's work are versatile sight axes - a horticultural stylistical device - which he applied at Sanssouci Park and elsewhere. As part of the Berlin-Potsdam cultural landscape, which stretches from the Pfaueninsel to Werder, many sites of Lenné's work are World Heritage Sites and have been under the protection of UNESCO collectively since 1990.

Prussian Garden Director-General
The accomplishments of the garden architect are reflected in his career progression. In 1818 he was an employee of the Royal Garden Authority, and in 1822, he received a promotion to Gardening Director. That same year, Lenné became a founding member of the Prussian Society for the Promotion of Horticulture. Lenné also accepted the position of Manager of the Division of Orchard Cultivation and later of the Parks Division.

In 1823, the Gardener Academy in Schöneberg and Potsdam was founded under his management. Here garden architecture was taught in a scientific manner for the first time. In 1828, Lenné was named the sole Garden Director and in 1845, Prussian Garden Director-General. The Prussian Academy of Arts made Lenné an honorary member.

In 1840, the recently enthroned King Friedrich Wilhelm IV assigned the urban planning of Berlin to Lenné. One of his most important achievements in this role survives in the building of the Luisenstadt Canal, constructed in 1852, between the Landwehrkanal and the River Spree in Kreuzberg. The canal's design was based on plans by Chief Building Officer Johann Carl Ludwig Schmid. In the 1850s, he advised on the planning of several cities, including Dresden, Leipzig and Munich.

Despite centering his life around Potsdam and Berlin, Lenné remained attached to his Rhenish homeland and contributed to the further beautification of Koblenz, particularly in the Rheinanlagen, which was under his management until 1861. His love of his work on the Rhine and Mosel made him decide to build the residence named for him, the Lenné-Haus, in which he wished to spend the evening of his life; however, the manner of his death did not allow this. Lenné's last resting place is at the Bornstedt Cemetery in Potsdam.

Busts of Peter Joseph Lenné are located at the Bonn Botanical Garden, on the bank of the Rhine (Alter Zoll), in the Landschaftspark Petzow that he himself designed, in Feldafing Park, in Park Sanssouci, and in the Kaiserin-Augusta-Anlagen in Koblenz (copy of a bust by Rauch). A recent bust was finished by Bad Homburg sculptor Otto Weber-Hartl.

Main works
 Park of Neuhardenberg Palace
 Roseninsel and Lenné Park in Feldafing at Lake Starnberg
 Klosterbergegarten in Magdeburg
 Zwierzyniec Park, Złotów
 Park Sanssouci in Potsdam
 Garden of Caputh Palace at Potsdam
 Landscape park at Petzow Palace, Werder
 Park Glienicke, Berlin
 Design for the landscape park in Blumberg (now part of Ahrensfelde)
 Design for the Landwehrkanal
 Design for the Luisenstädtischer Kanal, Berlin
 Design for the Tiergarten, Berlin
 Design for the parks at Blankensee Palace, in Trebbin
 Design for the Spa Gardens at Bad Homburg
 Gardens of Schloss Liebenberg in the Löwenberger Land, described in Fontane's Fünf Schlösser (Volume 5 of Wanderungen durch die Mark Brandenburg)
 Park of Remplin Palace
 Park of Wolfshagen Palace
 Park of Schloss Trebnitz (at Müncheberg)
 Lenné Park in Frankfurt (Oder)
 Kaiserin-Augusta-Anlagen on the Rhine and Electoral Palace Park in Koblenz
 Elisengarten, City Park and Spa Gardens in Aachen
 Park and Zehnthof in Sinzig
 Gardens of Friedrichsfelde Palace, now Tierpark Friedrichsfelde, in Berlin
 Clifftop gardens at Stolzenfels Castle, Koblenz
 Schlosspark, Brühl
 Design for the Spa Gardens at Bad Oeynhausen
 Park of Fürstlich Drehna, in Luckau (collaboration)
 Schillerpark (also called Lenné-Anlage, southeastern part of Promenadenring), and Johannapark, Leipzig
 Parts of Bürgerwiese gardens in Dresden
 Dresden Zoo

References

Specific

General
The information in this article is based on a translation of its German counterpart.
Gerhard Hinz, P.J.L. Das Gesamtwerk des Gartenarchitekten und Städteplaners, 2 volumes, 1989, Hildesheim, Zürich, New York
Petra Wißner, Magdeburger Biographisches Lexikon, 2002, 
F. v. Butlar (Ed.), Peter Joseph Lenné: Volkspark und Arkadien, 1989, Berlin
Harri Günther, Peter Joseph Lenné: Gärten, Parke, Landschaften, 1985, Berlin

Gerhard Fischer: Er prägte das Gesicht Berlins, in: Berlinische Monatsschrift, Edition Luisenstadt, 1999 

1789 births
1866 deaths
People from Bonn
Architects from Berlin
German landscape architects